Agnes Nyalonje is a Malawian politician who has served as the country's Education Minister since July 2020.

Education

Nyalonje has a Bachelor of Arts and a Bachelor of Social Science from the University of Malawi, a postgraduate diploma in personal and development from the University of Edinburgh and a master's degree in literature from the University of Leeds.

Career
Nyalonje was a lecturer in linguistics at the University of Edinburgh and at the University of Malawi. She worked as a consultant for the World Bank and as country director of UNAIDS from 2002 to 2004. She was also a technical adviser to the World Health Organization in South Africa.

Political career
Nyalonje was elected as the MP for Mzimba North representing the People's Party in 2014. She joined the newly formed UTM Party in October 2018, saying she was seeking to "fight rampant corruption" and overthrow the ruling Democratic Progressive Party. However, she withdrew from participating in the January 2019 primary elections.

Nyalonje was appointed Minister of Education by President Lazarus Chakwera on 8 July 2020. She retained the position in a January 2022 reshuffle. On commencing the role, Nyalonje said her priority was to overhaul the country's "rotten and archaic" education system, which has one of the lowest transition rates in the world, with only 6% of primary school students graduating to secondary school.

Nyalonje oversaw the reopening of schools on 7 September 2020 after their closure in March that year due to the COVID-19 pandemic. In February 2022, she launched a Code of Conduct for teachers that seeks to regulate professional conduct across the education sector. In June 2021, Nyalonje was sent out of Parliament for not wearing a school uniform as all other female members had done to mark the Day of the African Child and advocate for female education.

Personal life
Nyalonje is married to Robert Ridley, who is vice chancellor at Unicaf University Malawi.

References

External links
 March 2022 interview with Nyalonje

Living people
Women government ministers of Malawi
Education ministers
Government ministers of Malawi
People from Mzimba District
Alumni of the University of Edinburgh
Alumni of the University of Leeds
University of Malawi alumni
Academic staff of the University of Malawi
People's Party (Malawi) politicians
United Transformation Movement politicians
Members of the National Assembly (Malawi)
Year of birth missing (living people)